Pontegrande-Sant'Andrea is a village in Tuscany, central Italy, administratively a frazione of the comune of Calci, province of Pisa.

The village is composed by the two hamlets of Pontegrande and Sant'Andrea a Lama. It is about 11 km from Pisa and almost 1 km from the municipal seat of La Pieve in Calci.

References

Bibliography 
 

Frazioni of the Province of Pisa